Avaraikulam is a village in the Tirunelveli district of Tamil Nadu, India. It is located 72 km from Tirunelveli and 20 km from Kanyakumari. Most residents are involved in agrarian activities. The Arulmigu Mutharamman Thirukovil Temple in the village is famous for its Vaigasi (A month in the Tamil calendar) Thiruvizha. Avaraikulam is also referred to as 'Asaiyaa Pattinam', meaning 'Immovable Town'.

Places of attraction 
There are more than ten Hindu temples and two churches, one of them being the Roman Catholic church with St. Xavier as patron, which was constructed in the year 1907.

Ayya Vaikundar Nizhalthangal is a divine place to visit on the village situated on Vaikunda Street, next to the Mutharamman temple.

Present status of Avaraikulam 

People in Avaraikulam are the descendants of Pandiyan Kingdom and hail from Poochikadu and Kurumbur, near Tiruchendur.

The people living in Avaraikulam are mostly of the Nadar community. More than 95% of the village's population are farmers, and most of them cultivate flowers. Avaraikulam is famous for Jasmine, Rose, Kenthi, Vadamalli, Pitchi and Chevvanthi cultivation. All these flowers are collected by small traders and sold in the markets of nearby towns.

Education 
Baliah Marthandam Higher Secondary School is attended by young people in Avaraikulam and the surrounding villages. A few other private schools are also in the village.

Transport facilities 
Avarikulam is well connected by road . It is located on NH 44, the longest running north- south highway of India, the four-lane express way provides good connectivity to Avaraikulam. Scheduled bus services are available to Tirunelveli, Nagercoil, Kanyakumari. The Nearest Railway Station Valliyur Railway station is 18km to North , NagerCoil Railway Station is 20 Km to West and Kanyakumari Railway Station is 20 km to South , The train connections with Chennai, Bengaluru, Mumbai, Delhi, Howrah, etc.

Nearest airport is Thoothukkudi Airport, 75 km away. Thiruvananthapuram International Airport, 130 km away, and Madurai International Airport, 220 km away, also serve the people of Avaraikulam.

List of Ward Under Avaraikulam Panchayat 

 Ambalavanapuram
 Avaraikulam
 Chembikulam
 Mathaganeri
 Pillaiyar Kudieruppu
Villages in Tirunelveli district